The Botataung was a national Burmese language daily newspaper based out of Yangon in Myanmar. The paper, founded in 1958 by Thein Pe Myint, was arguably the leading leftist newspaper prior to its nationalization in 1964 by Gen. Ne Win's government. The paper became one of four Burmese-language dailies allowed to publish in the 1970s and 1980s although there was little differentiation among the four papers in terms of news coverage. The Botataung did not survive the current military government's cuts in the number of newspapers in the early 1990s.

The Botataung took its name from Yangon's Botataung Township, where its main headquarters was located.

See also
List of newspapers in Burma
Media of Burma

Daily newspapers published in Myanmar
Mass media in Yangon
Defunct newspapers